Larry Griffin was a criminal.

Larry Griffin may also refer to:

Larry Griffin (American football)
Symbolyc One, music producer ne Larry Griffin
Larry Griffin (thief) of the Patsy Conroy Gang
Larry Griffin, Irish postman who disappeared in 1929, likely murdered